Todd Merlin McMillon (born September 26, 1974) is a former American football cornerback, formerly of the Chicago Bears of the NFL.  He was signed originally as an undrafted free agent out of Northern Arizona University.  He also spent three years with the Saskatchewan Roughriders of the CFL. In 2001, he played for the Frankfurt Galaxy of NFL Europe and earned NFL Europe All-Pro honors.

McMillon models for such retailers as the GAP in his spare time, which has earned him the nickname "Runway" with his teammates.  He also appeared on an episode of Teammates on ESPN with teammate Brian Urlacher.

In June 2013, McMillon was told by his doctor that he had prostate cancer, and stated, "When he told me I was positive for cancer, I just went numb. I thought he had the wrong test. I played in the NFL. I am super healthy. I work out all the time, so I am in really good shape. I was like, 'This can't be me. I'm only 39 and I have prostate cancer?'" In August, McMillon had his prostate removed, which had contained the disease.

Notes

1974 births
Living people
American football cornerbacks
People from Bellflower, California
Chicago Bears players
Canadian football defensive backs
Saskatchewan Roughriders players
Northern Arizona Lumberjacks football players
American players of Canadian football
People from Cerritos, California
Sportspeople from Los Angeles County, California
Players of American football from California
Frankfurt Galaxy players